Robert Rikić (born 29 April 1990) is a Croatian professional basketball player who last played for BK JIP Pardubice of the NBL. Standing at 2.19 m, he plays at the center position.

Career 
Rikić started practicing basketball as a 16-year-old, after already becoming an under-16 national handball player for Croatia. After initially working individually with Široki's youth coaches, his first youth club was Dubrovnik, where he stayed for a year before moving to Zagreb. In August 2014 he moved to KK Budućnost Podgorica. During the first few years of his career, Rikić was also an under-18 national team member for Croatia.

Rikić spent the 2019-20 season with Sloboda Tuzla, averaging 13.9 points, 8.0 rebounds, and 1.1 blocks per game in ABA league play. On October 17, 2020, Rikic signed with USK Praha of the Czech National Basketball League.

References

External links
 Profile at aba-liga.com
 Profile at fiba.com

1990 births
Living people
ABA League players
Centers (basketball)
Croatian men's basketball players
Croats of Bosnia and Herzegovina
HKK Široki players
KK Budućnost players
KK Igokea players
KK Split players
KK Zagreb players
KK Zrinjevac players
OKK Sloboda Tuzla players
Basketball players from Mostar
USK Praha players
KK Dubrava players